Charles Reed (later Charles Verelst) (1814 – 13 December 1859) was an English architect.  He practised in Birkenhead, which was then in Cheshire and later in Merseyside.

Reed was an illegitimate son of Arthur Charles Verelst (1779–1843). He was brought up by an uncle. When his father's brother William Verelst (1784–1851) died, Reed inherited the estate at Aston Hall, Yorkshire, and changed his surname to Verelst.

During the 1840s and 1850s he worked for Sir William Jackson in laying out a housing estate in Claughton, and designing villas within that development.  Two roads in the estate, Charlesville and Reedville, are named after him.  In 1852–54 he was president of the Liverpool Architectural Society.  In addition to designing buildings locally, Reed also carried out works further afield, including in North Wales, the Lake District, and Lytham, Lancashire.  He was a commissioner of Birkenhead for many years.  He died in Claughton, Birkenhead.

See also
List of works by Charles Reed

References
Citations

Sources

1814 births
1859 deaths
19th-century English architects
People from Birkenhead
Architects from Cheshire